State Surgeon may refer to:
State Surgeon of Ireland
State Surgeon General, in United States